Mr. Potter (2002) is a novel by Antiguan born writer Jamaica Kincaid. It tells the story of a girl growing up without a father. When Mr. Potter, the father, died, a part of the girl (Elaine) died with him.

References

External links
 Kincaid writing about Mr. Potter
 An interview with Kincaid

Memoirs
2002 American novels
African-American novels
Novels by Jamaica Kincaid